Balsamorhiza lanata, with the common name lanate balsamroot,  is a species of plant in the tribe Heliantheae of the family Asteraceae native to California.

Distribution
The plant is endemic to Northern California. It is only found within Siskiyou County, in the Scott Mountains of the Klamath Range, and the Shasta Valley Mountains of the southern Cascade Range.

The species grows on grassy areas on hillsides and road embankments

Description
Balsamorhiza lanata is an herb up to 30 cm (12 inches) tall. Leaves are covered with dense hairs resembling wool, so they look white.

It has yellow flower heads, usually borne one at a time, with both ray florets and disc florets.

References

External links

lanata
Endemic flora of California
Flora of the Cascade Range
Flora of the Klamath Mountains
Plants described in 1935
Flora without expected TNC conservation status